Jelte Pal (born 16 October 2002) is a Dutch footballer who plays as a forward for Willem II.

Career
Pal is a youth product of BSC Roosendaal and -RBC, before moving to the youth academy of Willem II in 2019. He made his professional debut with Willem II in a 4–2 Eredivisie loss to PSV on 1 May 2022, coming on as a late sub in the 87th minute.

Personal life
Pal was born in the Netherlands to an Indonesian father and Dutch mother.

References

External links
 

2002 births
Living people
Sportspeople from Roosendaal
Dutch footballers
Dutch people of Indonesian descent
Association football forwards
Willem II (football club) players
Eredivisie players
Footballers from North Brabant